Bruno Gervais (born October 3, 1984) is a Canadian former professional ice hockey defenceman. He played with the New York Islanders, Tampa Bay Lightning and the Philadelphia Flyers in the National Hockey League (NHL).

Playing career
As a youth, Gervais played in the 1997 Quebec International Pee-Wee Hockey Tournament with the Richelieu Laser minor ice hockey team.

Gervais was selected in the sixth round of the 2003 NHL Entry Draft, 182nd overall, by the New York Islanders. Gervais was named captain of the Acadie-Bathurst Titan of the QMJHL as an 18-year-old even though there were many veteran players. In his 19-year-old season he hurt his knee at the December tryout camp for team Canada's under 20 team. He missed the rest of the season.

After scoring a career high 19 points in 63 games with the Islanders in the 2008–09 season, he was selected as the Nassau County Athlete of the Year Award in 2009.

On June 25, 2011, he was traded after 7 seasons within the Islanders organization to the Tampa Bay Lightning for future considerations. Two days later Gervais was signed by Tampa Bay to a one-year contract.
He played in 50 games during 2011–12 season with the Lightning, scoring a career high 6 goals.

After one season in Tampa Bay, Gervais signed a two-year contract as a free agent worth $1.65 million with the Philadelphia Flyers. Viewed as a depth defenseman, and after a short stint with heilbronner Falken of the German 2nd Bundesliga, he filled in as the Flyers' sixth blue liner in the lockout shortened 2012–13 season.

In the second year of his contract with the Flyers,  Gervais failed to make the team out of training camp. After clearing waivers he was assigned to AHL affiliate, the Adirondack Phantoms, for the duration of the 2013–14 season. In 59 games he led the Phantoms on the Blueline with 10 goals and 26 points.

On July 1, 2014, he was signed as a free agent to a one-year, two-way contract with the Colorado Avalanche. In the 2014–15 season, Gervais was assigned to AHL affiliate, the Lake Erie Monsters. As a veteran and older statesman of the club, Gervais was selected as team captain. In 71 contests with the Monsters, he produced 13 points from the blueline, but was unable to lead the Monsters to the post-season.

On July 6, 2015, Gervais opted to return for a second attempt in Germany, securing a one-year contract as a free agent with DEL club, Eisbären Berlin. Gervais remained in Berlin for two seasons, before announcing his retirement from his 13-year professional hockey career on July 13, 2017.

Personal
He has a brother, Maxime, who played 8 games for the Cape Breton Screaming Eagles in the QMJHL before playing semi-professionally within Quebec. Gervais is the childhood best friend of fellow player Max Talbot whom he met while playing minor hockey in Quebec.

Career statistics

References

External links

 
Bruno Gervais on Twitter

1984 births
Living people
Acadie–Bathurst Titan players
Adirondack Phantoms players
Bridgeport Sound Tigers players
Canadian ice hockey defencemen
Eisbären Berlin players
French Quebecers
Heilbronner EC players
Sportspeople from Longueuil
Lake Erie Monsters players
New York Islanders draft picks
New York Islanders players
Philadelphia Flyers players
Ice hockey people from Quebec
Tampa Bay Lightning players
Canadian expatriate ice hockey players in Germany